Richard Gasquet won in the final 6–3, 5–7, 7–6(7–5) against Fernando Verdasco, to end his two and a half year title drought.

Seeds
The top four seeds receive a bye into the second round.

Draw

Finals

Top half

Bottom half

References
Main Draw 
Qualifying Draw

Singles